Baron  was an admiral in the Imperial Japanese Navy, who served as Navy Minister in the early 1930s.

Biography
Abo was born in Saga Prefecture as Sawano Yasusaburō, where his father was the commandant of the military academy where he went to school. His father died when he was still young, but the deputy commandant, Abo Kiyoyasu, took notice of young Abo and adopted him into his household on the condition that he marry his daughter. 

As Kiyokazu Abo, he graduated from the 18th class of the Imperial Japanese Naval Academy, ranked 11th out of 61 cadets. He served his midshipman tour on the corvettes Hiei, Jingei, cruisers  and Takao. After commissioning to ensign, he was assigned back to Takao, followed by cruiser  and the gunboat  during the First Sino-Japanese War (1894–95). After the end of the war, he was assigned to the cruiser .

Promoted to lieutenant in 1897, he continued to serve on Izumi, becoming chief navigator in 1898. In 1903, he was promoted to lieutenant commander, and reassigned as chief gunnery officer to the cruiser , followed by the battleship , during which time he saw combat in the Russo-Japanese War at the naval Battle of Port Arthur, Battle of the Yellow Sea, and the final decisive Battle of Tsushima. During the Russo-Japanese War, he became famous for coining nicknames for each of the ships in the Russian fleet, to make identification and transmission of orders to the Japanese gunnery crews more understandable.

After the war, he was assigned as naval attaché to the United Kingdom from November 1905 to February 1908. During his time overseas, he was promoted to commander. On his return, he instructed at the Naval Staff College, and in 1909 succeeded to the title of danshaku (baron) under the kazoku peerage system on the death of his foster father.

In 1910, Abo received his first command: the cruiser . Promoted to captain in December 1912, he was again sent to England as naval attaché from March 1913 to April 1915. On his return, he assumed command of the battleship .

In December 1916, Abo was promoted to rear admiral and became chief of the first section of the Imperial Japanese Navy General Staff. In December 1920, he was promoted to vice admiral and became Vice Chief of the Imperial Navy General Staff, where he assisted Admiral Yamashita Gentarō in the implementation of the Washington Naval Treaty. 

Abo was Japan's naval delegate to the League of Nations from 1922–1923, He served as Director of Naval Shipbuilding Command in 1923, and as Vice Minister of the Navy in 1924. In April 1925, he was appointed commander in chief of the Kure Naval District.

On his promotion to admiral on 1 April 1927, Abo became commander in chief of the Yokosuka Naval District. He subsequently served on the Supreme War Council and as part of Japan's delegation to the London Naval Treaty Conference in 1929.

From 3 October 1930 to 13 December 1931, Abo served as Naval Minister in the cabinets of Prime Minister Wakatsuki Reijirō and Hamaguchi Osachi. 

Abo was a political moderate and a leading supporter of the Treaty Faction within the Imperial Japanese Navy, and hoped for a revival of the Anglo-Japanese Alliance through diplomacy.

During his term in office, the military was embroiled with the chain of command controversy as to whether or not the Imperial Japanese Army and Imperial Japanese Navy were answerable to the elected Diet of Japan and Prime Minister, or were answerable only directly to the Emperor of Japan. 

Abo went into the reserves in 1934, and retired in 1940.

References

Books

External links

Notes 

1870 births
1948 deaths
Imperial Japanese Navy admirals
People from Saga Prefecture
Ministers of the Imperial Japanese Navy
Kazoku
Japanese military personnel of the First Sino-Japanese War
Japanese military personnel of the Russo-Japanese War
Japanese military personnel of World War I